N3, or rijksweg 3, is a freeway in the province of South Holland in the Netherlands. It connects Dordrecht-Zuid with Papendrecht. It's a freeway that connects the motorways A15 and the A16. There are seven exits.

Motorways in the Netherlands
Motorways in South Holland
Transport in Dordrecht
Papendrecht